Carabus sylvestris haberfelneri is a subspecies of beetle in the family Carabidae that can be found in Austria and Germany.

References

sylvestris haberfelneri
Beetles described in 1891